Jovana Milosevic (born 12 October 1982, Sarajevo, SFR Yugoslavia) is an Australian female handball player born in Bosnia and Herzegovina. She was a member of the Australia women's national handball team, who competed at the 2000 Summer Olympics, playing five matches. The Australian team were beaten by Angola into tenth place.

References 

1982 births
Living people
Handball players at the 2000 Summer Olympics
Australian female handball players
Olympic handball players of Australia
Sportspeople from Sarajevo
Bosnia and Herzegovina emigrants to Australia